Artyom Nikolayevich Yarmolitsky (born 10 April 1994) is a Russian former football player.

Club career
He made his debut in the Russian Football National League for FC Tom Tomsk on 31 August 2015 in a game against FC Shinnik Yaroslavl.

References

External links
 Profile by Russian Football National League

1994 births
Living people
Russian footballers
Russia under-21 international footballers
Association football defenders
FC Dynamo Moscow reserves players
FC Tom Tomsk players
Russian expatriate footballers
Expatriate footballers in Armenia
FC Mika players
FC Khimik-Arsenal players
FC Arsenal Tula players